St Paul's Church is a Roman Catholic church in Dover, Kent, England. It was built from 1867 to 1868. It is situated on Maison Dieu Road, north of Pencester Gardens in the centre of the town. It is a Gothic Revival church designed by E.W. Pugin.

History

Origin
In 1822, a mission started in the town that ministered to Catholics in the area and Mass was said in a house, 45 Snargate Street.

In 1834, a location had to be bought, because Mass was being said in the loft of a house on St James' Street, and it was not large to hold everybody there. A former Wesleyan chapel in Elizabeth Street was bought for the Catholics to worship in. It was bought for £425 and it cost £400 to renovate. A further £350 was paid for an adjacent presbytery. In May 1935, new chapel was opened. Yet, less than 30 years later, with the increasing population in the area, a new site needed to be found to accommodate the larger Catholic congregation.

Construction
In 1864, the present site on Maison Dieu Road was bought for £450. In 1867, construction of the church began. Construction of the church started in 1867 and cost £2300. Much of the money for the new building came from an endowment from the estate of Mary Winifred St Martin, Countess de Front (died 1830). She was the wife of Philip St Martin, Count de Front (died 1812), an ambassador of the Kingdom of Sardinia to the Court of St James's. On 15 May 1868, Thomas Grant the Bishop of Southwark opened the church.

In 1872, a school was built next to the church and a year later, in 1873, an apse was added to the church.

Developments
In 1959, the church was repaired. This was done by lowering the chancel and bringing forward the altar, closer to the nave of the church. In 1964, the nave was renovated, new pews were added and the pulpit was removed.

On 23 October 1987, an arsonist set fire to the church. The fire destroyed the church roof and organ. After setting fire to the church, the arsonist went to Canterbury to rob St Thomas of Canterbury Church there. A few days later, he was arrested by the police.

Repair work to the church started on 1 June 1988 and on 28 October the church was reopened. Mass was celebrated that day by the Archbishop of Southwark, Michael Bowen.

Parish

Very close to the church is St Edmund's Chapel, it was built in 1262, but was dissolved in 1544. In the 1960s, efforts were made to restore it, achieved primarily through the efforts of Fr Terrence Tanner, parish priest of St Paul's Church from 1958 to 1970. The chapel is owned by The St Edmund of Abingdon Memorial Trust.

In 2015, together with St Finbarr's Church in Aylesham, the church became part of the parish of the Good Shepherd.

St Paul's Church has two Sunday Masses, they are at 6:00pm on Saturday and 9:15am on Sunday.

See also
 Roman Catholic Archdiocese of Southwark

References

External links
 Official Parish site
 St Paul's Church on Archdiocese of Southwark

Churches in Dover, Kent
Roman Catholic churches in Kent
Gothic Revival church buildings in England
Gothic Revival architecture in Kent
Roman Catholic churches completed in 1868
1867 establishments in England
19th-century Roman Catholic church buildings in the United Kingdom
E. W. Pugin church buildings